Andriy Shevchuk (born 12 August 1985) is a retired Ukrainian football striker.

Career
On 5 July 2009, he opened score for Ukraine in the game against Canada at the 2009 Summer Universiade in Serbia.

External links 
 
 Stats on Sevstopol club

References

1985 births
Living people
People from Korosten
Ukrainian footballers
Ukraine student international footballers
Association football forwards
FC Krystal Kherson players
FC Sevastopol players
1. FC Tatran Prešov players
Slovak Super Liga players
Ukrainian expatriate footballers
Expatriate footballers in Slovakia
Ukrainian expatriate sportspeople in Slovakia
FC Metalurh Zaporizhzhia players
FC Ternopil players
FC Krymteplytsia Molodizhne players
FC Hirnyk-Sport Horishni Plavni players
Crimean Premier League players
Ukrainian First League players
Universiade gold medalists for Ukraine
Universiade medalists in football
Medalists at the 2007 Summer Universiade
Medalists at the 2009 Summer Universiade
Sportspeople from Zhytomyr Oblast